is a 2002 Japanese kaiju film directed by Masaaki Tezuka, written by Wataru Mimura, and produced by Shogo Tomiyama. Produced and distributed by Toho Studios, it is the 27th film in the Godzilla franchise and the fourth film in the franchise's Millennium period, and is also the 26th Godzilla film produced by Toho. The film features the fictional giant monster character Godzilla, along with an updated version of the mecha character Mechagodzilla, who is referred to in the film as Kiryu. The film stars Yumiko Shaku, Shin Takuma, Kou Takasugi, Yuusuke Tomoi, Kumi Mizuno, and Akira Nakao, with Tsutomu Kitagawa as Godzilla and Hirofumi Ishigaki as Kiryu.

Like the previous films in the franchise's Millennium era, Godzilla Against Mechagodzilla is a reboot that ignores the events of every installment in the Godzilla film series aside from the original 1954 Godzilla. The film was followed by a direct sequel, Godzilla: Tokyo S.O.S., the following year.

Plot
In 1999, 45 years after the original Godzilla's attack, maser-cannon technician Lieutenant Akane Yashiro is unable to kill a new member of Godzilla's species during her first fight and accidentally knocks a vehicle down the mountain, where it and its occupants are crushed by Godzilla. As a result, Akane is demoted while scientists, including single father Tokumitsu Yuhara, are gathered to build a bio-mechanical robot from the original Godzilla's skeleton. The cyborg Mechagodzilla, nicknamed Kiryu, is finished and inducted into the Japan Self-Defense Forces along with its human pilots, the Kiryu Squadron, with Akane as the primary pilot. However, memories of Akane's actions during the original fight still linger as one of her squadron mates, Second Lieutenant Susumu Hayama, holds her responsible for the death of his brother.

Four years later, Kiryu is unveiled in a global presentation where its remote systems, use of command aircraft, and Absolute Zero Cannon are shown. Simultaneously, Godzilla returns, and Kiryu is launched into battle. In the midst of this however, Godzilla's roar causes Kiryu to experience memories of the original Godzilla's death and destroy the city while Godzilla retreats. The horrified Kiryu Squadron is powerless to stop the rampaging cyborg until it runs out of energy and is brought back to headquarters for repairs.

Meanwhile, Akane deals with Hayama's attempts to make her leave and Tokumitsu's attempts to get to know her despite her desiring solitude, though she begins to develop a bond with Tokumitsu's young daughter Sara. As Godzilla mounts another attack, the repaired Kiryu is deployed and confronts Godzilla once more. Kiryu gains the upper hand, but as it prepares the Absolute Zero Cannon, Godzilla fires its atomic breath, knocking the cyborg away and diverting the blast. With Kiryu disabled and the remote piloting system taken off-line, Akane orders Hayama to land his command craft so that she can use Kiryu's internal backup cockpit. Before she leaves, Hayama wishes her luck, forgiving her. Piloting Kiryu directly, Akane closes in on Godzilla, hoping to use the Absolute Zero Cannon at point-blank range. The two monsters collide, and Akane uses Kiryu's thrusters to propel them out to sea before firing. In the aftermath, a wounded Godzilla retreats once more while Kiryu is heavily damaged. With the Kiryu Squadron successful in repelling Godzilla, Kiryu is taken back to base for repairs. In a post-credits scene, Akane agrees to have dinner with the Yuharas and salutes Kiryu.

Cast

Production
Following the successful revival of the monsters Mothra and King Ghidorah the previous year, Toho elected to bring back Mechagodzilla for the next installment in the Godzilla franchise. Unlike previous iterations of Mechagodzilla, this version is mostly referred to by the name Kiryu (derived from Kikai-ryu, the Japanese word for "machine dragon") throughout the film. This was done to differentiate the character from previous versions. It was, however, referred to as "Mecha-G" and "Mechagodzilla" in the English dubbing of the next film, Godzilla: Tokyo S.O.S..

Japanese baseball star Hideki Matsui has a cameo as himself in the film, due to his nickname "Godzilla".

As has been done since the early 1970s, Toho had the international version of Godzilla Against Mechagodzilla dubbed in Hong Kong. This dubbed version was released on DVD by Sony Pictures Home Entertainment in 2004.

Soundtrack 
Godzilla Against Mechagodzilla the first film of the series with a soundtrack recorded outside of Japan. Director Masaaki Tezuka once again turned to composer Michiru Oshima following their successful collaboration on Godzilla X Megagurius, with the score itself being recorded by Moscow International Symphonic Orchestra, under conductor Konstantin D. Krimets.  Tezuka and Oshima would both return for the film's sequel, Godzilla: Tokyo S.O.S.

Release

Theatrical
Godzilla Against Mechagodzilla was released in Japan on 14 December 2002. The film was released in select theaters in the United States for one day on November 3, 2022 via Fathom Events to commemorate the franchise's 68th anniversary, dubbed "Godzilla Day." It pulled $335,000 for the latter release, a respectable gross for a film released only for a single night with no major advertisement beforehand.

Home media
The film was released by Sony Pictures/Columbia Tristar Home Entertainment on DVD on March 23, 2004.  It was released under the American title, Godzilla Against MechaGodzilla - International Version, which has new English opening and closing credits but is otherwise the same as the original Japanese version.

Its second release was on Blu-ray by Sony as part of the Toho Godzilla Collection. and was released on September 9, 2014 as part of a 2-disc double feature with Godzilla, Mothra and King Ghidorah: Giant Monsters All-Out Attack.

Critical response
Reviews of Godzilla Against Mechagodzilla have been positive. Mike Pinsky of DVD Talk gave the film three stars out of five, saying: "While I did have some minor complaints, [this is] a fine entry in the series." Pinsky said "the plot is more interesting than most giant monster movies," and "the battle scenes, which are the main reason anyone watches these films to begin with, were great." Giving the film a "B+" score, Mark Zimmer of Digitally Obsessed said that it's "a good deal of fun and one of the better entries in the series." Digital Monster Island gave the film a "B" score, calling it "a fun and exciting film that should please most kaiju fans."

Notes

References

Sources

External links

 
 
 
 

2002 films
2000s Japanese-language films
2000s monster movies
2000s political films
2002 science fiction films
Films directed by Masaaki Tezuka
Films set in 1999
Films set in 2003
Films set in Tokyo
Films set in Yokohama
Films set in Chiba Prefecture
Giant monster films
Godzilla films
Japanese political films
Japanese science fiction films
Japanese sequel films
Kaiju films
Mecha films
Reboot films
Toho films
Films with screenplays by Wataru Mimura
Films scored by Michiru Ōshima
2000s Japanese films